Radio P1 may refer to:

DR P1, Danish radio station
NRK P1, Norwegian radio station
NRK P1+, Norwegian radio station, via DABradio and online
Sveriges Radio P1, Swedish radio station

See also
P1 (disambiguation)